Canto di primavera (meaning 'Song of Spring') is the eighth studio album by the Italian progressive rock band, Banco del Mutuo Soccorso. the album was first released in 1979. the album marked the return to lyrical songs after the instrumental album, ...di terra. the album reached to No. 36 in the Italian album chart.

Track listing
 Ciclo – 4:20
 Canto di primavera – 5:30
 Sono la bestia – 4:35
 Niente – 4:00
 E mi viene da pensare – 3:20
 Interno città – 6:30
 Lungo il margine – 4:50
 Circobanda – 6:30

Translation
 Round – 4:20
 Song of Spring – 5:30
 The Beast – 4:35
 Nothing – 4:00
 And I'm Thinking – 3:20
 Inner City – 6:30
 Along the Margin – 4:50
 Circobanda – 6:30

Personnel

 Vittorio Nocenzi — keyboards
 Gianni Nocenzi — Clarinet, keyboards
 Rodolfo Maltese — Electric guitar, trumpet, vocals
 George Aghedo — percussion
 Pier Luigi Calderoni – drums
 Gianni Colaiacomo — Bass
 Luigi Cinque — Saxophone, harmonica
 Francesco DiGiacomo – Vocals
with:
 Gianni Prudente – Sound engineer

Banco del Mutuo Soccorso albums
1979 albums